Jukebox is the eighth album by Cat Power, the stage name and eponymous band of American singer-songwriter Chan Marshall. It was released on January 22, 2008 on Matador Records. A limited-edition silver foil deluxe package was also released containing a bonus disc with five extra songs.

The album is composed almost entirely of cover songs, save for "Song to Bobby" and "Metal Heart" ("Metal Heart" was previously recorded and released in 1998). It is Marshall's second record of cover songs; her first, The Covers Record, was released in 2000.

Track listing

Sales and chart positions
The album debuted at number 12 on the Billboard 200 chart, selling about 29,000 copies in its first week. As of 2012, sales in the United States have exceeded 137,000 copies, according to Nielsen SoundScan. It was awarded a gold certification from the Independent Music Companies Association which indicated sales of at least 100,000 copies throughout Europe.

Year-end charts

Sales

Personnel
Chan Marshall – vocals
Stuart Sikes – engineer
Dirty Delta Blues
Judah Bauer – guitar
 Jim White – drums
 Erik Paparazzi – bass
 Gregg Foreman – piano, organ
Special Guests 
Spooner Oldham – piano, organ
 Teenie Hodges – guitar
 Larry McDonald – percussion
 Dylan Willemsa – viola
 Matt Sweeney – guitar

References

External links
Official album site at 
Notes on Cat Power's Jukebox pitchforkmedia.com
Coming January 22 '08: Cat Power - 'Jukebox'
Cat Power 'Jukebox' Final Sequence

Cat Power albums
2008 albums
Covers albums
Matador Records albums